Akzhol Makhamadzhanovich Makhmudov (born 15 April 1999) is a Kyrgyzstani Greco-Roman wrestler. He won the silver medal in 77kg event at the 2020 Summer Olympics in Tokyo, Japan. He won the gold medal in the 77kg event at the 2022 World Wrestling Championships held in Belgrade, Serbia.

Wrestling career

Until senior level
Makhmudov took up wrestling aged six, following his two elder brothers. He later won two Asian cadet championships and the 2017 Junior Asian championships.  Makhmudov also became the cadet world champion in 2016, and won a silver medal at the 2017 Junior World Championships in Tampere.

2018
In 2018, Makhmudov had his first senior level tournament when he entered the Kyrgyzstan National Wrestling Championships. He won the 77 kg division, and was included to the senior national team.

At the 2018 Asian Championships, Makhmudov competed in the 72 kg category, and won Ahmad Mahmoud Dashan (12–2), then Kuldeep Malik (8–0) and Tomohiro Inoue (7–0). In the final he faced the 2017 World Wrestling Championships silver medalist Demeu Zhadrayev. He won 8–6, becoming the youngest ever wrestler from Kyrgyzstan to earn a gold medal at senior level at the Asian Championships.

At the 2018 Asian Games, Makhmudov moved back to the 77 kg division and reached the final, where he lost to Mohammadali Geraei.

At the 2018 Junior World Championships, he lost to Islam Opiev of Russia in the quarter-final but went on to wrestle in the repechage stage and won a bronze medal against Kamal Bey of the US in their rematch of the Junior World Championships final.

2020 Olympic Games
Due to the pandemic, the 2020 Summer Olympic Games were postponed from their originally scheduled 2020 start date, to the Summer of 2021.  Missing out on Olympic Qualification, Makhmudov had to wrestle at the Asian Olympic Qualification Tournament in Almaty, Kazakhstan.  Makhmudov won all three of his matches and obtained gold, which awarded him Olympic qualification.

To start his first Olympic journey, Makhmudov defeated Tunisia's Lamjed Maafi by 11-0 technical superiority, a winner from the Africa and Oceania Wrestling Qualification tournament, he then defeated former two-time European Champion, Rafig Huseynov of Azerbaijan which won him a place in the semi-finals.  Faced with 2-time European Championships and Games medallist, Armenian wrestler Karapet Chalyan, and beat his Armenian opponent 6-2 to advance him into the finals, opposite 2012 Olympic Silver medallist, and 2019 World champion, Hungary's Tamás Lőrincz.  After a low-scoring six minutes, Lőrincz won the match 2-1, with Makhmudov leaving with a silver medal

2022 World Championships
Makhmudov returned to the mat at the 2022 Asian Wrestling Championships held in the Mongolian capital, Ulaanbaatar.  Makhmudov won the gold medal by beating Maxat Yerezhepov in the final at 77 kg.

Major results

Personal life
Makhmudov is the third child in a family of a salesman. He currently studies at the Kyrgyz State Law Academy in Bishkek. He enjoys playing billiards and tennis.

References

External links
 

Living people
People from Osh
People from Osh Region
Kyrgyzstani male sport wrestlers
1999 births
Wrestlers at the 2018 Asian Games
Medalists at the 2018 Asian Games
Asian Games medalists in wrestling
Asian Games silver medalists for Kyrgyzstan
Wrestlers at the 2020 Summer Olympics
Medalists at the 2020 Summer Olympics
Olympic medalists in wrestling
Olympic silver medalists for Kyrgyzstan
Asian Wrestling Championships medalists
World Wrestling Championships medalists
Olympic wrestlers of Kyrgyzstan
21st-century Kyrgyzstani people
World Wrestling Champions